Mosedale Beck may refer to:
Mosedale Beck (Wast Water), river in Cumbria, England, entering Wast Water and thence River Irt
Mosedale Beck (Glenderamackin), river in Cumbria, England, tributary of River Glenderamackin, and thence River Greta, River Derwent
Mosedale Beck (Swindale), river in Cumbria, England, tributary of Swindale Beck, and thence River Lowther, River Eden

See also
List of Mosedale valleys and Mosedale Becks
Mosedale (disambiguation)